Matrix-remodelling associated 5 is a protein in humans that is encoded by the MXRA5 gene.

Function 

This gene encodes one of the matrix-remodelling associated proteins. This protein contains 7 leucine-rich repeats and 12 immunoglobulin-like C2-type domains related to perlecan. This gene has a pseudogene on chromosome Y.

Clinical relevance 

Mutations in this gene have been seen frequently mutated in cases of non-small cell lung carcinoma.

References

Further reading 

 
 
 

Extracellular matrix proteins